Bednidhi Poudel (born 12 March 1973) is a Nepali singer and musician. He is known for his composition having spiritual essence with the blended flavor of eastern classical and western music.

Musical career
Bednidhi Poudel’s affection with music began at a very tender age in Itahari. He got his talent crafted further under various maestros such as Gopalnath Yogi, Bhola Rai, and Kusheswor Rai, Poudel has also obtained diploma in music from Sur Sangam Bidhyalaya of Allahabad in India.

Poudel, an ardent fan of Narayan Gopal and Mehdi Hassan released his first album Chhadke Nazar in 1999. The album consists of Aaja Yo Andhyarole (lyrics – Suman Pokhrel), Nashalu Raat (lyrics – himself), Nazarke Uthayethen (lyrics – Mahesh Marseli) and three other songs After listening to the song Aaja Yo Andhyarole in Poudel's vocal and composition, Nepali theater maestro Sunil Pokharel organized his solo performance at Gurukul Theater in Kathmandu. He performed his solo at Gurukul Theater in June 2011 rendering songs of different genres, including ghazals and Nepali modern songs.

The Kathmandu Post writs about poudel as, "Paudel sang songs of different genres, including ghazals and Nepali aadhunik songs during the show. "This is my first solo performance in the capital and I am happy to be presented by Gurukul," says Paudel. The singer sang to the tunes of the guitar and the Tabala accompanied by the notes of the harmonium which he played by himself. Though this lack of an orchestra affected the quality of the performance, the singer managed to wow most audiences with the beautifully composed melody of his songs. Paudel has been trained by music maestros Gopal Nath Yogi and other acclaimed Gurus of the country. "In addition to the formal education that I got from my Gurus, my self-practice and study have helped shape my skills in composing music and singing songs," he adds. Although Paudel has plans on working on a solo music album, the bleak scenario of album-sales—which is really low—in Nepal discourages him. Despite this, he is working on the arrangement and recording of four of his original compositions."

Discography

References

External links
 A feature article on Bednidhi Poudel
 An article on Bednidhi Poudel
 Aaja Yo Andhyarole by Bednidhi Poudel
 Some songs on Bednidhi Poudel's composition
 https://www.goodreads.com/videos/94867-pagliyera-pokhiun-jhain
 http://annapurnapost.com/News.aspx/story/23962
 HighBeam 
 https://web.archive.org/web/20160420175438/http://www.panbarinews.com/%E0%A4%B0%E0%A5%8B%E0%A4%9A%E0%A4%95/2072-11-002

1973 births
21st-century Nepalese male singers
People from Dhankuta District
Living people
Soul singers
20th-century Nepalese male singers
Nepalese ghazal singers